The glass cliff is a hypothesised phenomenon of women in leadership roles, such as executives in the corporate world and female political election candidates, being likelier than men to achieve leadership roles during periods of crisis or downturn, when the risk of failure is highest.

Origins 
The term was coined in 2004 by British professors Michelle K. Ryan and Alexander Haslam of University of Exeter, United Kingdom. In a study, Ryan and Haslam examined the performance of FTSE 100 companies before and after the appointment of new board members, and found that companies that appointed women to their boards were likelier than others to have experienced consistently bad performance in the preceding five months. This work eventually developed into the identification of a phenomenon known as the glass cliff— analogous to the concept of a glass ceiling, but implying the inability to perceive the dangers of the cliff's transparent edge rather than the false promise of elevated organizational positions which can be "seen" through a ceiling of glass but which are actually unattainable. Since the term originated, its use has expanded beyond the corporate world to also encompass politics and other domains.

Overview 
Ryan and Haslam's research showed that once women break through the glass ceiling and take on positions of leadership they often have experiences that are different from those of their male counterparts. More specifically, women are more likely to occupy positions that are precarious and thus have a higher risk of failure—either because they are appointed to lead organizations (or organizational units) that are in crisis or because they are not given the resources and support needed for success.

Extending the metaphor of the glass ceiling, Ryan and Haslam evoked the notion of the "glass cliff" to refer to a danger which involves exposure to risk of falling but which is not readily apparent. CEO tenure is typically shorter at companies which are struggling, compared to those which are stable.

The glass cliff concept has also been used to describe employment discrimination experienced by leaders who are members of minorities or disabled.

Evidence of the glass cliff phenomenon has been documented in the field of law. A 2006 study found law students were much likelier to assign a high-risk case to a female lead counsel rather than a male one. A 2010 study found undergraduate students in British political science likelier to select a male politician to run for a safe seat in a by-election, and much likelier to select a female candidate when the seat was described as hard to get. A 2014 analysis of US Fortune 500 leadership found that firms with weak performance were likely to promote women into CEO positions over white men.

Other research has failed to confirm the existence of glass cliff phenomenon. A 2007 study of corporate performance preceding CEO appointments showed that women executives are no more likely to be selected for precarious leadership positions than males.

Explanation 
Many theories have been advanced to explain the existence of the glass cliff.

University of Houston psychology professor Kristin J. Anderson says companies may offer glass cliff positions to women because they consider women "more expendable and better scapegoats." She says the organizations that offer women tough jobs believe they win either way: if the woman succeeds, the company is better off. If she fails, the company is no worse off, she can be blamed, the company gets credit for having been egalitarian and progressive, and can return to its prior practice of appointing men.

Haslam and Ryan say their studies show that people believe women are better-suited to lead stressed, unhappy companies because they are felt to be more nurturing, creative, and intuitive. These researchers argue that female leaders are not necessarily expected to improve the situation, but are seen as good people managers who can take the blame for organizational failure.

Haslam has said that women executives are likelier than men to accept glass cliff positions because they do not have access to the high-quality information and support that would ordinarily warn executives away. Utah State University professors Ali Cook and Christy Glass say women and other minorities view risky job offers as the only chance they are likely to get.

A 2007 study found that female news consumers in the United Kingdom were likelier than male ones to accept that the glass cliff exists and is dangerous and unfair to women executives. Female study participants attributed the existence of the glass cliff to a lack of other opportunities for women executives, sexism, and men's in-group favoritism. Male study participants said that women are less suited than men to difficult leadership roles or strategic decision-making, or that the glass cliff is unrelated to gender.

Implications for women executives 
Glass cliff positions risk hurting the women executives' reputations and career prospects because, when a company does poorly, people tend to blame its leadership without taking into account situational or contextual variables. Researchers have found that female leaders find it harder than male ones to get second chances once they have failed due to having fewer mentors and sponsors and less access to a protective "old boys' network".

However, some researchers argue that companies in bad situations offer more opportunity for power and influence compared with companies that are stable.

Examples 

News media have described the following as examples of the glass cliff.
 In 1990, two female Premiers were appointed in Australia: Joan Kirner inherited significant deficit in Victoria, while Carmen Lawrence headed a party that had previously been accused of corruption. In 2009, Kristina Keneally was appointed Premier of New South Wales amid low polling for her party and their eventual defeat in 2011. Julia Gillard was appointed as Australia's first female prime minister and subsequently ousted amid procedural complaints about the leadership spill.
 In 1993, the Canadian Progressive Conservative Party, facing low approval ratings and almost assured loss in the upcoming general elections, elected Kim Campbell, then Defense Minister, to replace Brian Mulroney as its leader. The election dealt the Progressive Conservatives one of the most devastating defeats in Canadian history, reducing them from 156 seats to 2.
 In 2002, then-unprofitable telecommunications company Lucent Technologies appointed Patricia Russo CEO, and then replaced her with Ben Verwaayen.
 In 2008 after the Icelandic banking crisis, various women were appointed to repair the industry with the rationale that broader perspectives would prevent the same mistakes from occurring.
 In 2009 Indonesian Finance Minister Sri Mulyani , was accused of misappropriating the country's funds to conduct an alleged unauthorized bail-out for Bank Century a year prior which was failing at the time. She contested that the Rp. 6,7 Trillion ($710 Million) bail out was necessary, in order to prevent the country's economy from crashing and received a warning of the bank's impending failure from the central bank. She decided to resign as finance minister in 2010 after 5 years and 7 months in office during Susilo Bambang Yudhoyono 's presidency, keeping the country's economy stable during the world financal crisis. 
 In 2010 Dilma Rousseff was appointed candidate for president of Brazil by Partido dos Trabalhadores (Labor Party) when they were being investigated by the Federal Police for allegations of corruption schemes. She won the elections and later, in 2014, the reelection. She was then impeached in 2016. 
 In 2011, "a horrible time for newspapers", Jill Abramson was appointed editor of The New York Times, and in 2014 she was fired.
 In 2012, Marissa Mayer was appointed as the CEO of Yahoo after it lost significant marketshare to Google.
 In 2015, Ellen Pao resigned amidst controversy after several months as CEO of Reddit. Much of the furore was directed at the firing of popular Reddit employee Victoria Taylor, though former Reddit CEO Yishan Wong revealed that this was the decision of cofounder Alexis Ohanian, not Pao.
In 2016, Theresa May became leader of the Conservative Party and Prime Minister of the United Kingdom shortly after a referendum result to leave the EU caused the pound to drop in value to levels not seen in 30+ years.
In 2020, Agnès Buzyn replaced Benjamin Griveaux as the LREM candidate for Mayor of Paris, after initial candidate's explicit photos are revealed.
In 2020, Sophie Wilmès became first women prime minister in Belgium, during the coronavirus crisis.
In 2021, Alexis George was appointed as the CEO of the troubled Australian financial services company AMP Limited.
In 2021, Jen Oneal was appointed the first female lead of Blizzard Entertainment after the California Department of Fair Employment and Housing v. Activision Blizzard lawsuit which alleged the company had a culture of sexual misconduct.
In 2021, Kamala Harris was tapped to lead the response to challenges at the U.S. southern border.
In 2022, Liz Truss resigned from her position as the prime minister of the United Kingdom after 44 days in office, the shortest term of any prime minister in British history.

See also
Bamboo ceiling
Glass ceiling
 List of female top executives
 National Association for Female Executives
 After the Glass Ceiling, a Glass Cliff (Ep. 319), Freakonomics Radio
 The Glass Cliff: How People of Color and Women Leaders Are Often Positioned to Fail, The Takeaway, Public Radio International and WNYC

References

Further reading 
 Gunter, Barrie. Why Women Should be Taken More Seriously in the Boardroom (Routledge, 2017).
 Oyster, Carol K. "Perceptions of Power: Female Executives’ Descriptions of Power Usage by 'Best' and 'Worst' Bosses." Psychology of Women Quarterly 16.4 (1992): 527-533.

 Vincent, Annette, and Judy Seymour. "Mentoring among female executives." Women in Management Review 9.7 (1994): 15-20.
 Zenger, J., & Folkman, J. "Are Women Better Leaders Than Men?" Harvard Business Review  15 (2012): 80-85. online

Corporate governance
Feminist economics
2000s neologisms
2004 neologisms
Employment discrimination
Women-related neologisms